The CBX750, or RC17 is a Honda motorcycle sold primarily in Europe, South Africa and Australia. Manufactured from 1984 to 1988, the CBX750 was developed from the CB750, in parallel with the VF750, a wholly new design. It is also used by motorcycle police in Malaysia, Singapore, Hong Kong, Turkey, Gibraltar and Ireland.

The pre-1988 CBX750 had a  front wheel, which restricts replacement tire choice.

Police version
The Police Version, the CBX750P was kept in production until 1994.

 

The CBX750P is based on a Japanese CB750SC "Horizon". Which is like a CB750SC/CB700SC Nighthawk S, but with an 18-inch front wheel and shaft drive.
Unlike the Honda CB700SC, the CBX750P uses a slipper clutch (back-torque limiter) and diaphragm spring to engage clutch.

Similarities between the CBX750P and the CBX750, other than the name, end at them sharing most of the engine parts.

The motorcycle also has four safety guards (two on each side), a meter-stop option (to record top speed), loud speakers, and no fuel gauge.

The Garda Síochána (Irish National Police) Traffic Corps section used the CBX750P in two generations. The only difference being that the second generation had a extendable rear blue flashing light on a pole. 
The CBX replaced BMW K75's and Kawasaki GT750's from 1984. It is reported that Honda restarted the production line in 1997 to fulfil an order from the Irish Police.
In Ireland they began to be replaced from 1998 with the Honda ST1100 (Pan European) with the last being retired in 2002.

At least two were still in use in Gibraltar in 2016.

F2

The CBX 750 F2 (Also CBX 750 FII) is a Honda motorcycle sold primarily in Europe, Brazil and Japan. The CBX 750 F2 was developed from the CBX750, in parallel with the VF750. Until today, many spare parts can be ordered directly from Brazil.

References

External links 
 CBX750 HORAIZON Engine 1984 at Honda Worldwide

CBX750
Sport touring motorcycles
Motorcycles introduced in 1984